Pamela B. Green is a two-time Emmy-nominated, award-winning American film director and producer known for her work in feature film titles and motion graphics. She is the director, writer, editor and producer of the documentary Be Natural: The Untold Story of Alice Guy-Blaché. In 2020, she was awarded the Jane Mercer Researcher of the Year award at the FOCAL International awards for her work on Be Natural.

PIC Collective 
In 2005, Green co-founded PIC Collective, an audiovisual communications studio focused on entertainment and motion design. PIC Collective designs and produces content for motion pictures, television, and commercials, and has done main title sequences for over 100 feature films and for every major Hollywood studio. Since PIC Collective's founding, Green has creative-directed and produced main titles and marketing campaigns for The Kingdom, Twilight, The Cabin in the Woods, The Muppets, 42, and numerous others, as well as TV show packages for the Academy Awards, the Billboard Awards, the Critics’ Choice Awards, and the mini-documentary sequences for VH1ʼs Soul Divas: History of Soul Music.

The title sequence for The Kingdom was honored with a place on the Independent Film Channel's list “The 50 Greatest Opening Title Sequences of All Time”. PIC Collective was also awarded a 2013 Key Art Award in Audio/Visual Technique for the titles of The Wolverine.

On November 21, 2019, PIC Collective won Silver for a Clio Award in the category best Audio Visual Technique in Motion Graphics.

Be Natural 
In 2012, Green began working on Be Natural: The Untold Story of Alice Guy-Blaché, a feature-length documentary about the first female film director. Green produced, directed, wrote and edited the documentary with executive producer Robert Redford. In 2013, Green and her team raised over $200,000 via Kickstarter to further fund the documentary. .
In addition, Green was a recipient of the Sundance Institute Documentary Fund. The film premiered in the Official Selection of Cannes Classics 2018 and then had its North American premiere at the Telluride Film Festival, followed by the Deauville American Film Festival, New York Film Festival, and the BFI London film Festival. It was acquired by Zeitgeist Films in association with Kino Lorber and was released in theaters in April 2019. The film was well-received by most critics, with Deadline's Pete Hammond calling it "the Best Film In Cannes" and Katie Walsh for the Los Angeles Times calling it "illuminating". Be Natural was nominated by the Critics Choice Documentary Awards in the  Best First Documentary Category. Be Natural was recently awarded Best Documentary at the 2020 Vancouver International Women in Film Festival. On November 17, 2019, after a screening of the film at the Barrymore Film Center, the Fort Lee Film Commission awarded director Pamela B. Green with the Barrymore Film Center Alice Guy-Blaché Award and narrator Jodie Foster with the Barrymore Film Center Award.

Be Natural was nominated for five awards at the 2020 FOCAL International Awards and took home the prize for Best Use of Footage in a Cinematic Feature and the Jane Mercer Researcher of the Year Award.
In December, the film was named one of the 50 Best Films of 2020 in the UK by The Guardian. 
Later in December, the film was named one of the 10 Best Documentaries in Peter Bradshaw's film picks of 2020.

In 2021, Be Natural was nominated for a Peabody Award.

Legwork Collective 
In 2018, Green founded Legwork Collective, a media company that focuses on telling inspiring and moving scripted and unscripted stories that bring overlooked figures to the forefront via film, television, and audio.

In 2020, Legwork Collective received a grant from The Redford Center to direct a nonpartisan Public Service Announcement encouraging young people to Take Action and Vote!

Filmmaker 
Green directed the 2008 short Compact Only, which was nominated for Best Short at the Milan International Film Festival, for the Audience Award in the Fresno Film Festival, Best Short at the Beverly Hills Shorts Festival, and for the Best Short at The Int'l Fest of Cinema and Technology. The film won Best Short at the Tallahassee Film Festival, Best Short at the Treasure Coast International Film Festival, Accolade Film Award Winner, Best Comedy Short at the Gone With the Film Festival, Winner Aloha Accolade Award Honolulu, and much more.

Green was a co-producer on the 2010 documentary Bhutto about the 11th Prime Minister of Pakistan, Benazir Bhutto.

In 2011, Green directed the music video for The Click Five's song “Don’t Let Me Go”, which was created in partnership with MTV EXIT and featured a message to raise awareness about human trafficking.

In 2012, Green directed a commercial for Super-Max Razors which starred actor Gerard Butler.

In 2012, Bhutto was nominated for an Emmy for Outstanding Continuing Coverage of a News Story – Long Form.

In 2014, Green was included in Saul Bass's book Anatomy of Film Design, listing her as being part of a "wholly digitally trained generation of title designers."

In 2014, Green was selected to serve as a juror for Excellence in Title Design category at the 2014 South by Southwest Film Festival.

In 2016, Green directed an Audi commercial.

In 2016, Green was selected to serve as a judge for The Motion Awards for motionographer.com.

In 2018, Green's documentary Be Natural: The Untold Story of Alice Guy-Blaché premiered at Cannes.

In 2020, Green directed the nonpartisan PSA, Take Action and Vote! for the Redford Center.

In 2021, Green's documentary Be Natural: The Untold Story of Alice Guy-Blaché was nominated for a Peabody 

In 2021, Be Natural was nominated for an Emmy for Outstanding Research:Documentary.

Green is currently working with co-writer Joan Simon and co-producer Cosima Littlewood on a feature biopic script about the mother of cinema, Alice Guy-Blaché, which will feature new material not seen in the documentary Be Natural.

Green has also developed Aces Never Sleep, a female-driven detective series, with Jamie Wolf's Foothill Productions and former CAA agent John Ptak, and they are in talks with different financiers. The series takes place during a pandemic, social unrest, economic crisis, racism and a polarized America.  Kate Warn and her team of lady operatives are behind the true origins of the Pinkerton Detective Agency, founded by fervent abolitionist Allan Pinkerton. Historical figures appear throughout the series, including Frederick Douglass and Abraham Lincoln, notably when the agency's most valued Ace Kate Warn and fellow detectives thwart an assassination attempt on the President-Elect.

Awards and accolades

Selected filmography

See also 
 Alice Guy-Blaché

References

External links 
 
 Reviews website
 pamelabgreen.com website
BE NATURAL: THE UNTOLD STORY OF ALICE GUY-BLACHÉ
The Cabin in the Woods Interview at Art of the Title
  The Kingdom Interview at Art of the Title
 PIC Agency website
Legwork Collective website
  Be Natural: The Untold Story of Alice Guy-Blaché website
Los Angeles Times Review of Be Natural: The Untold Story of Alice Guy-Blaché
  Be Natural as IndieWire's Project of the Day
  Review of Bhutto in Variety
 Super-Max SMX4™ commercial
  "Don't Let Me Go" music video
  Compact Only short film

Year of birth missing (living people)
Living people
American film directors
American film producers